The 1957 Irish general election to the 16th Dáil was held on Tuesday, 5 March, following a dissolution of the 15th Dáil on 12 February by President Seán T. O'Kelly on the request of Taoiseach John A. Costello on 4 February. It was the longest election campaign in the history of the state, spanning 30 days. The general election took place in 40 Dáil constituencies throughout Ireland for 147 seats in Dáil Éireann, the house of representatives of the Oireachtas.

The 16th Dáil met at Leinster House on 20 March to nominate the Taoiseach for appointment by the president and to approve the appointment of a new government of Ireland. Costello lost office, and Éamon de Valera was appointed Taoiseach, forming the 8th Government of Ireland, a single-party majority Fianna Fáil government.

Campaign
The 1957 general election was precipitated by the crisis in the trade balance and the government's reaction to it. As a result of this crisis, Fianna Fáil tabled a motion of no confidence in the inter-party government of Fine Gael, Labour and Clann na Talmhan. The Dáil has been scheduled to resume on 13 February. Rather than face defeat in the vote, on 4 February the Taoiseach John A. Costello, sought a dissolution of the Dáil for 12 February. The campaign was fought largely over economic issues and the situation in Northern Ireland. In the North, the IRA had launched Operation Harvest which drew much popular support in the south. Sinn Féin had been re-built and re-organized as a party by Paddy McLogan and was fielding abstentionist candidates.

Fianna Fáil had produced a major policy document in January, criticising many of its own policies in regard to the economy. While they did not know an election was imminent this became the backbone of their manifesto. The importance of free trade was played up by Fianna Fáil in a clear rejection of the protectionist policies they had advocated in the past. The architect of many of these new policies was the spokesperson for Industry and Commerce and the heir-apparent of the party, Seán Lemass. At 75 years of age Éamon de Valera was fighting his last general election as leader of the party. In spite of his age, he carried out a vigorous campaign, often being accompanied by brass bands and torch-lit processions. The Fianna Fáil message was simple: coalition governments were unstable.

The other parties, most of them having enjoyed a stint in government over the previous three years, fought the election on their record in office, Fine Gael in particular. Clann na Talmhan failed to broaden their appeal and remained the voice of the farmers. Clann na Poblachta under Seán MacBride had agreed not to stand in constituencies where Sinn Féin were fielding candidates and lost two of its three seats. Sinn Féin, fighting one of its first post-war elections on an abstentionist ticket won 4 seats.

Result

|}

Voting summary

Seats summary

Government formation
Fianna Fáil majority government formed. Éamon de Valera became Taoiseach for the last time.

Change in membership

First time TDs
Kevin Boland (Appointed Minister for Defence on his first day in the Dáil)
Lionel Booth
Seán Browne
Batt Donegan
Paddy Clohessy
Patrick Dooley
Pádraig Faulkner
Jim Gibbons
Charles Haughey
Gus Healy
Brigid Hogan
John Joe McGirl
Jack Murphy
Ruairí Ó Brádaigh
Eighneachán Ó hAnnluain
James O'Toole
John Joe Rice
Patrick Tierney

Re-elected TDs
Frank Loughman

Outgoing TDs
Patrick Crowe (Lost seat)
Seán Collins (Lost seat)
Peadar Doyle (Retired)
Brendan Glynn (Retired)
James Hession (Lost seat)
Edward Kelly (Lost seat)
Joseph Roddy (Lost seat)

See also
Members of the 9th Seanad

Notes

References

1957 elections in Europe
General election, 1957
1957
16th Dáil
General election
March 1957 events in Europe